The Rural Municipality of Lipton No. 217 is a rural municipality (RM) in the Canadian province of Saskatchewan within Census Division No. 6 and  Division No. 1.

History 
The RM of Lipton No. 217 incorporated as a rural municipality on December 11, 1911.

Heritage properties
There are three historical sites located within the RM.
Hayward School – Constructed in 1904–1952, the site contains a one-room school house and barns.
Lipton Jewish Cemetery – Established in 1902, the cemetery is the resting place for early Jewish immigrants.
Tomecko House – Constructed in 1917–18, by Mr. Stephen Tomecko, the house served as a gathering place for dances after harvest.

Fort Qu'Appelle-Touchwood Hills Trail 
A section of the Carlton Trail from the Touchwood Hills to the Fishing Lakes in Qu'Appelle Valley was called the Fort Qu'Appelle-Touchwood Hills Trail and a portion of it passed through the RM of Lipton No. 217. The route was used regularly by traders, settlers, Métis, and First Nations from the 1850s until 1890 when the railway came through the area. The Dominion Telegraph line was built alongside the trail. In 1885 General Frederick Middleton used this trail with his column of militia en route to Batoche, Saskatchewan during the North-West Rebellion. After the completion of the railway, the trail continued to be used by locals. Eventually, though, with the introduction of the automobile, the trail, and many others like it, fell into disuse and were often ploughed over.

A section of the Fort Qu'Appelle-Touchwood Hills Trail is commemorated as a historic site alongside Highway 35 north of the town of Fort Qu'Appelle in the RM of Lipton No. 217. Ruts from the Red River carts can still be seen in the prairie grass by the site.

Geography

Communities and localities 
The following urban municipalities are surrounded by the RM.

Villages
It also surrounds the Village of Dysart.

Demographics 

Government 
The RM of Lipton No. 217 is governed by an elected municipal council and an appointed administrator that meets on the first Tuesday of every month. The reeve of the RM is Corey Senft while its administrator is Frank Kosa. The RM's office is located in Lipton.

See also 
List of historic places in rural municipalities of Saskatchewan

References 

Lipton

Division No. 6, Saskatchewan